Michael James Jackson (born 4 December 1973) is an English football manager and former professional footballer. He is an under-23 coach for Burnley and served as caretaker manager for the first team.

As a player, Jackson was a defender who played in the Football League for Crewe Alexandra, Bury, Preston North End, Tranmere Rovers, Blackpool and Shrewsbury Town. He moved into management in 2014 and has been in charge of both Tranmere Rovers and Shrewsbury Town.

Playing career
Jackson started his career as a trainee at Crewe Alexandra in 1992. He signed for Bury in August 1993 on a free transfer where he stayed until 1997 making 125 league appearances and scoring nine goals. In March 1997 he signed for Preston North End for a fee of £125,000. In seven years at the club, he made 251 league appearances and scored 17 goals. While at Preston, he had a one-month loan spell at Tranmere Rovers from December 2002 to January 2003, having been frozen out of the team at Deepdale by manager Craig Brown. In May 2004, he signed for Tranmere on a free transfer, making 84 appearances in two years at the club.

In June 2006, Jackson joined Blackpool on a free transfer. He scored his first goal for Blackpool on 19 August 2006 in a 4–2 league win at Bristol City. He became an instrumental part of the Blackpool team and captained the side in their promotion to the English Championship in May 2007. Jackson picked up an injury in February 2008 which kept him out for two months before he made a late-season comeback. On 7 May 2008, however, he was released by Blackpool. After his goal against Bristol City, he scored further goals against Norwich City in the FA Cup and Southend United in the League Cup.

On 23 June 2008, it was reported that Jackson was about to sign a two-year contract with Shrewsbury Town. The transfer was completed the following day, along with the club record transfer for Grant Holt. Jackson was a regular in the Shrewsbury side, notably scoring in a 7–0 win over Gillingham, but did not play again after a 3–1 defeat away at Luton Town on 21 February 2009.

It was announced on 13 January 2010 that Jackson had retired from playing due to a persistent knee injury, as a specialist advised him not to risk his long-term health by continuing, but he was to remain at the club until the end of the 2009–10 season in a coaching capacity.

Coaching and managerial career
Jackson continued in his coaching role at Shrewsbury, and was named as caretaker manager for the final match of the 2009–10 season following the dismissal of Paul Simpson. He resumed his coaching role under new manager Graham Turner, and was appointed as caretaker manager again following Turner's resignation on 22 January 2014. A month later, he was given the managerial position on a contract running until the end of the 2013–14 season, but was unable to save the team from relegation to League Two. Despite this, the club opted to retain his services as assistant to new manager Micky Mellon, alongside goalkeeping coach Danny Coyne.

After a sequence of only two wins in the opening eleven matches of the 2016–17 season, Jackson left the club by mutual consent in October 2016 along with Mellon, before once again being appointed as his assistant again at Tranmere shortly afterwards.

Following Mellon's departure to Dundee United, Jackson was named manager of Tranmere Rovers on 18 July 2020. He was sacked on 31 October 2020.

In July 2021, Jackson was appointed interim manager of the Burnley Under-23s team. On 15 April 2022, after Sean Dyche was dismissed, Burnley appointed Jackson as caretaker manager for their away match against West Ham United, which they drew 1–1 two days later. After a 2–1 win away at Watford on 30 April 2022, Jackson became the first Burnley manager to win three of his first four league games in charge since Jimmy Mullen in October 1991. He won the Premier League Manager of the Month award for April after leading relegation-threatened Burnley to three wins and one draw. However, the team were relegated to the Championship at the end of the 2021–22 season after suffering three losses in their last four matches.

Managerial statistics

Honours
Player
Football League One play-offs: 2006–07

Individual
PFA Team of the Year: 1999–2000 Second Division
Premier League Manager of the Month: April 2022

References

External links

Living people
1973 births
Sportspeople from Runcorn
English footballers
Association football defenders
Crewe Alexandra F.C. players
Bury F.C. players
Preston North End F.C. players
Tranmere Rovers F.C. players
Blackpool F.C. players
Shrewsbury Town F.C. players
English Football League players
English football managers
Shrewsbury Town F.C. managers
Tranmere Rovers F.C. managers
English Football League managers
Burnley F.C. managers
Premier League managers
Tranmere Rovers F.C. non-playing staff
Burnley F.C. non-playing staff